Phil Goldstone (1893–1963) was a Polish-born American film producer and director. He was also a real estate developer in Palm Springs. Goldstone was involved with low-budget Poverty Row companies such as Majestic Pictures.

Selected filmography

Director
 A Western Adventurer (1921)
 Montana Bill (1921)
 Once and Forever (1927)
 Backstage (1927)
 The Girl from Gay Paree (1927)
 Snowbound (1927)
 Wild Geese (1927)
 The Sin of Nora Moran (1933)
 Damaged Goods (1937)

Producer
 The Firebrand (1922)
 Deserted at the Altar (1922)
The Cub Reporter (1922)
 Wildcat Jordan (1922)
 Lucky Dan  (1922)
 His Last Race (1923)
 The White Panther (1923)
Danger Ahead (1923)
 Her Man (1924)
 The Sword of Valor (1924)
 The Other Kind of Love (1924)
 The Virgin (1924)
 The Cowboy and the Flapper (1924)
 Fighter's Paradise (1924)
 Marry in Haste (1924)
 The Torrent (1924)
 Do It Now (1924)
 The Martyr Sex (1924)
 Soiled (1925)
 The Silent Guardian (1925)
 The Wild Girl (1925)
 Three in Exile (1925)
 Brand of Cowardice (1925)
 Pals (1925)
 The Reckless Sex (1925)
 Lost at Sea (1926)
 The Medicine Man (1930)
 Murder at Midnight (1931)
 The Pocatello Kid (1931)
 Arizona Terror (1931)
 The Drums of Jeopardy (1931)
 Two Gun Man (1931)
 Alias – the Bad Man (1931)
 The Single Sin (1931)
 Caught Cheating (1931)
 Morals for Women (1931)
 Hell Fire Austin (1932)
 White Zombie (1932)
 Whistlin' Dan (1932)
 The Crusader (1932)
 The World Gone Mad (1933)
 Sing Sinner Sing (1933)
 The Vampire Bat (1933)
 What Price Decency (1933)
 Curtain at Eight (1933)
 Unknown Blonde (1934)
 O'Shaughnessy's Boy (1935)
 Last of the Pagans (1935)
 Woman Wanted (1935)
 Age of Indiscretion (1935)
 Yukon Flight (1940)
 Sky Bandits (1940)

References

Bibliography
 Michael R. Pitts. Poverty Row Studios, 1929–1940: An Illustrated History of 55 Independent Film Companies, with a Filmography for Each. McFarland & Company, 2005.

External links

1893 births
1963 deaths
American film producers
American film directors
Polish emigrants to the United States